A statue of Adam Clayton Powell Jr., sometimes called the Adam Clayton Powell Jr. Memorial, is installed in Harlem, New York City.

See also

 2005 in art

References

2005 establishments in New York City
2005 sculptures
Bronze sculptures in Manhattan
Harlem
Monuments and memorials in Manhattan
Outdoor sculptures in Manhattan
Sculptures of African Americans
Sculptures of men in New York City
Statues in New York City